Anne Amable Augier du Fot (born in Aubusson on 14 March 1733; died in Soissons in 1775) was a French doctor. He was known as the author of a book on the "art des accouchements" (which is actually by Jean-Louis Baudelocque). Du Fot was a columnist and wrote on animal epidemiology. He was also an ardent opponent of the Jesuits.

Bibliography 
 Review of the Catechism in Dante Lénardon, L'Année littéraire, 1775, IV, p.  136–137 
 Nicolas Baudeau (dir.), Ephemerides of the citizen, or Chronicle of the national spirit, Paris, NA Delalain, 1765–1772 — Passim
 Jacques Gélis, The midwife or the doctor: a new conception of life, Fayard, 1988
 Jacques Gélis, The tree and the fruit: birth in the modern West, 16th – 19th century,  Fayard, 1984
 Joseph Joullietton, History of the Marche and the country of Combrailles, P. Betoulle, 1814, p.  97–98
 Christelle Rabier, “Popularization and diffusion of medicine during the Revolution: the example of surgery”, in Annales historique de la Révolution française, no 338  (October–December 2004)

References 

18th-century French physicians

1733 births

1775 deaths